Pind may refer to:
PIND or Particle Impact Noise Detection
Søren Pind (born 1969), Danish politician

See also
 includes many placenames which include the word